"I Can't Dance" is the fourth track from English rock band Genesis's fourteenth studio album, We Can't Dance (1991), and was released in December 1991 as the second single from the album. The lyrics were written by drummer Phil Collins and the music was written by the whole band. The song peaked at number seven on both the US Billboard Hot 100 and the UK Singles Chart, and also received a Grammy Award nomination for Best Pop Performance by a Duo or Group With Vocals in 1993. In Europe, the song reached number one in Belgium and the Netherlands, while peaking within the top five in Austria, Germany, and Portugal.

Background

During one recording session, Mike Rutherford first created the main riff of the song he called "Heavy A Flat", to which Phil Collins suddenly improvised the basic concept for "I Can't Dance!". The riff was actually inspired by a Levi Strauss & Co. TV commercial (in the studio, the song was created under the working title "Blue Jeans") that used The Clash song "Should I Stay or Should I Go". Originally, the band did not think of it as anything more than a joke recording that would be discarded quickly, because the song was too simple, too bluesy, and completely unlike Genesis' style. Tony Banks said in an interview: "It was one of those bits you thought was going to go nowhere. It sounded fun but wasn't really special".

It was not until Banks decided to add keyboard sound effects to complement Rutherford's playing that "I Can't Dance" took on a whole different feeling. The band came to appreciate the sly humor inherent in the song and chose to not only record it properly, but to put it on the album as a single. 

Banks also said in an interview that the recording of a song that featured minimal production indicated a direction Genesis could have gone in to make themselves stand out better against the rising popularity of alternative rock: "Opposite to what Genesis has done as general practice, which is taking an idea and turning it into a long or complex composition, it was just taking an idea, and leaving it alone".

Critical reception
The Daily Vault's Christopher Thelen found that "I Can't Dance" is "a goofy number that features Genesis mocking themselves for being un-hip. (Best line from this song: "Ooh, she's got a body under that shirt"—dirty old man alert!)" He added, "If you ever get a chance to view the video, watch it; it's hysterical." Sally Margaret Joy from Melody Maker wrote, "Phunny Phil, the Maker's Phavourite Phella, grinds and huffs his good self over one of those minimal, stab, crunch, plink, rock numbers. It seems to be a bit of a dig at those jeans ads that feature divine male bimbos." A reviewer from People Magazine described it as a "melodically fetching, radio-ready track", and "a simple slammer with an arrangement that shows off the group’s remarkable facility for aural atmospherics." Kara Manning from Rolling Stone declared it as "a gritty, tongue-in-cheek anthem for the average guy." Ted Shaw from The Windsor Star wrote that "I Can't Dance", "with its bluesy melody and metallic effects, is unlike anything the band has ever done, and it's a wonderful pop creation."

Music video
The accompanying music video for "I Can't Dance" (directed by frequent collaborator Jim Yukich) illustrates the artifice and false glamour of television advertisements. Collins commented that the video was designed to poke fun at the models in jeans commercials, and each verse refers to things that models in these commercials do. During the first verse, he portrays a hitchhiker on a remote desert road in Hi Vista, California. A woman speeds past in a Porsche 911, then backs up to Collins and lets a lizard at his feet get in; she drives off, leaving him stranded. Collins is seen on a beach in the second verse, trying to pull his jeans away from a sunbather's angry dog; for the third, he loses them in a pool game at a bar.

These scenes are intercut with footage of the band and film crew members setting up the areas as if to shoot a series of commercials. The video ends with a parody of the video for the Michael Jackson song "Black or White," in which Collins imitates Jackson's erratic dancing. Banks and Rutherford eventually arrive to escort Collins off the set, at which point he goes limp and they have to drag him away.

The song created the "'I Can't Dance' dance" (a series of stiff, stylised motions). Collins explained in an interview that when he was at stage school, he would see kids that would always use the same hand and the same foot when they were tap dancing, meaning they could not co-ordinate. He then copied their movements and the 'dance' was born.

Collins told Rolling Stone that the music video and the song were a joke about male models in jeans commercials who could not dance or talk, but could only walk in their jeans. He also said the audience was confused and could not figure out the joke because clearly Phil Collins can dance, as he dances at the end of the video.

Release
Single releases contained an extended remix entitled "Sex Mix". This was later released on the Genesis Archive 2: 1976–1992 box set retitled as the "12" Mix". The remixers were brothers Howard Gray and Trevor Gray of Apollo 440.

The B-side, "On the Shoreline", was also included on Genesis Archive 2: 1976–1992. The song features a sample of guitarist Mike Rutherford's guitar playing that was captured by Tony Banks during a jam session. The peculiar sound (dubbed "elephantus" by the band) was also used in the song "No Son of Mine." Several chord passages also appeared in "Living Forever." Rolling Stone commented that "On the Shoreline" is "enjoyable in an un-ironic way. Here, as usual, Phil Collins sounds most comfortable at the raspy apex of his vocal range, pushing his voice to the breaking point as Tony Banks' synths drift through like mists."

The "Jesus He Knows Me" CD single also included a version titled "I Can't Dance (the other mix)" with a running length of 5:59.

Live performances
"I Can't Dance" was played live during The Way We Walk, Calling All Stations (with Ray Wilson on vocals), Turn It On Again and The Last Domino? tours. On the band's Turn It On Again Tour and The Last Domino? Tour, it was included as an encore. During live performances, the song was transposed to a lower key to accommodate Collins' deepening voice.

A live version appears on their albums The Way We Walk, Volume One: The Shorts, and Live over Europe 2007, as well as on their DVDs The Way We Walk - Live in Concert and When in Rome 2007

Rutherford and Daryl Stuermer accompanied Collins doing the walk across the stage.

Ray Wilson continued to cover the song on his solo live album after his departure from Genesis. His version is a bluesier rendition, closer to the original.

Track listings

 7-inch and cassette single
 "I Can't Dance"
 "On the Shoreline"

 12-inch and CD single
 "I Can't Dance"
 "On the Shoreline"
 "I Can't Dance" (sex mix)

 Australian CD single and Japanese mini-album
 "I Can't Dance"
 "On the Shoreline"
 "In Too Deep" (live)
 "That's All" (live)

 US CD single and Japanese mini-CD single
 "I Can't Dance" (LP version) – 4:00
 "I Can't Dance" (sex mix) – 6:59 (7:02 in Japan)

 US maxi-CD single
 "I Can't Dance" (LP version) – 4:00
 "On the Shoreline" – 4:45
 "In Too Deep" (live) – 5:28
 "That's All" (live) – 4:54
 "I Can't Dance" (sex mix) – 6:59

Personnel 
 Tony Banks – keyboards
 Phil Collins – vocals, drums, drum machine 
 Mike Rutherford – electric guitars, bass guitar

Charts and certifications

Weekly charts

Year-end charts

Certifications

Covers

In the 1990s, "Weird Al" Yankovic created a parody of the video for "I Can't Dance" for his series Al TV, in which he appeared alongside the band. He added shots of himself to several of the band shots.

In 2007, German death metal group Debauchery recorded "I Can't Dance" and released it on their fourth album, Back in Blood.

In 2014, Finnish metal band Sonata Arctica released a cover of "I Can't Dance" as a bonus track on their album Ecliptica: Revisited; 15th Anniversary Edition. The band made a promotional video which features all of the band members dancing in cities that they visited during their Pariah's Child tour.

References

 Fielder, Hugh (2000). Genesis Archive #2: 1976—1992 [CD liner notes]. Gelring Ltd.

External links
 Genesis official site
 

1991 songs
1992 singles
Atlantic Records singles
Blues rock songs
Dutch Top 40 number-one singles
Genesis (band) songs
Songs about dancing
Songs written by Mike Rutherford
Songs written by Phil Collins
Songs written by Tony Banks (musician)
Virgin Records singles